Freedom at Midnight is an album by American pianist David Benoit released in 1987, recorded for the GRP label. The album reached #5 on Billboard's Contemporary Jazz chart.

Track listing
All tracks written by David Benoit; except as noted.
"Freedom at Midnight" (David Benoit, Nathan East) - 4:14
"Along the Milky Way" - 4:08
"Kei's Song" - 4:39
"The Man With The Panama Hat" - 4:18
"Pieces Of Time" - 3:16
"Morning Sojourn" - 4:22
"Tropical Breeze" - 4:43
"Passion Walk" - 5:13
"Del Sasser" (Sam Jones, Donald Wolf) - 6:03
"The Last Goodbye" - 5:52

Personnel

 David Benoit – arrangements, acoustic piano (1, 3-6, 9), Kawai MIDI grand piano (2, 7, 8), acoustic piano solo  (10)
 Randy Kerber  – synthesizers (1-4, 6, 7, 8)
 Dann Huff –  guitar (1, 2, 4, 8)
 Russ Freeman – guitar (5, 6, 7)
 Osamu Kitajima – koto (2)
 Abraham Laboriel – bass  (1, 2, 4, 8)
 Bob Feldman – bass (3, 5, 6, 7)
 John Pattitucci – acoustic bass (9), upright bass (9)
 Jeff Porcaro – drums (1, 2, 4, 8), mallets (6)
 Tony Morales – drums (3, 5, 6, 7, 9)
 Lenny Castro – percussion (1, 2, 4)
 Joe Porcaro –  percussion (1, 2, 4, 6, 8)
 Michael Fisher –  percussion (3, 5, 6, 7)
 Sam Riney – tenor saxophone (1, 7), soprano saxophone (4, 5, 8), alto sax solo (6), alto saxophone (9)

Strings and Horns
 Suzie Katayama – conductor
 Larry Corbett – cello
 Doug David – cello
 Tim Barr – double bass
 Arni Egilsson – double bass
 Joe Meyer – French horn
 Richard Todd – French horn
 Gary Herbig – saxophone
 Ray Pizzi – saxophone
 John Madrid – trumpet
 Walter Johnson – trumpet
 Cynthia Morrow – viola
 Jimbo Ross – viola
 Becky Barr – violin
 Doug Cameron – violin
 Bruce Dukov – violin
 Pavel Farkas – violin
 Clayton Haslop – violin
 Pam Henderson – violin
 William H. Henderson – violin
 Gina Kronstadt – violin
 Sid Page – violin, concertmaster
 Artjur Zadinsky – violin

Production
 Producer – Jeffrey Weber 
 Co-Producer – Seth Marshall 
 Executive Producers – Dave Grusin and Larry Rosen
 Engineers – Bob Loftus and Allen Sides 
 Additional Engineer – Steve MacMillan
 Assistant Engineers – David Ahlert, Tony Chiappa, Tommy Kane and Joe Schiff.
 Mastered by Bernie Grundman at Bernie Grundman Mastering (Hollywood, California).
 Creative Director – Andy Baltimore 
 Album Cover – Andy Baltimore, David Gibb and Dan Serrano.
 Cover Photography – Glen Wexler

Charts

References

External links
David Benoit-Freedom at Midnight at AllMusic
David Benoit-Freedom at Midnight at Discogs

1987 albums
GRP Records albums
David Benoit (musician) albums